Voksh is a village and tribal region situated in western Kosovo, which is inhabited by 570 people, all of whom are Albanians. The village of Voksh is also home to the Vokshi tribe which is part of the larger polyphyletic Thaçi tribe.

Etymology 
The name for Vokshi stems from the Albanian word vogël, which means “small” or “little”.

Demographics 
According to the 2011 census, the village had 570 inhabitants, all of whom are Albanian and Muslim. The population of Voksh belongs to the Vokshi tribe, which lives in the locally defined Vokshi region that encompasses Drenoc, Lloqan, Pobërgja, Vokshi, Sllup, Prejlep and Prokolluka.

History 
Voksh is mentioned for the first time in the Ottoman defter of the Sanjak of Scutari in 1485 as having 19 households. In 1571 it was mentioned in the tax registration of the Sanjak of Dukagjin as having 24 households.

According to oral tradition, the ancestors of all Vokshi tribesmen are the brothers Alë, Tolë and Hodergjon.

Ottoman period 
In 1838 Austrian military physician Joseph Müller noted that 20 mohammedan households lived in the village of Vokś.

The local population resisted the Tanzimat reforms, most notably the League of Prizren member Sulejman Vokshi who took part in the uprising of Dervish Cara and notoriously orchestrated the attack against marshal Mehmet Ali Pasha, which marked the first military action of the league.

First Balkan War 
In 1912 the Montenegrin army embarked on a campaign to forcibly convert the local Albanian population to Orthodox Christianity, which led to people fleeing the village and emigrating to Turkey.

Interwar period 
The first attested non Albanians entered the village during the colonization of Kosovo by the Kingdom of Yugoslavia, when four colonist families from Montenegro were settled there.

Kosovo War 
During the Kosovo War, 98% of the villages houses were burnt down by Serbian forces, alongside 6 Kulla dwellings. The majority of the population was forced to flee their homes to Albania but was able to return after the war ended.

References 

Villages in Gjakova